

See also
International child abduction
International child abduction in the United States
List of bills related to international child abduction by US Congress

References

International child abduction